The Men's 50 metre freestyle event at the 2010 Commonwealth Games took place on 8 and 9 October 2010, at the SPM Swimming Pool Complex.

Nine heats were held, with most containing the maximum number of swimmers (eight). The heat in which a swimmer competed did not formally matter for advancement, as the swimmers with the top sixteen times qualified for the semifinals and the swimmers with the top eight times from there qualified for the finals.

Heats summary

Semifinals

Semifinal 1

Semifinal 2

Final

References

External links

Aquatics at the 2010 Commonwealth Games
Commonwealth Games